Tamás Petres (born 3 September 1968) is a retired Hungarian football striker. He was a squad member for the 1985 FIFA World Youth Championship, became Nemzeti Bajnokság I top goalscorer in 1988–89 and was capped for Hungary.

References

1968 births
Living people
Hungarian footballers
Fehérvár FC players
Veszprém KC players
SKN St. Pölten players
Győri ETO FC players
FC Tatabánya players
Rákospalotai EAC footballers
Nemzeti Bajnokság I players
Nemzeti Bajnokság II players
Nemzeti Bajnokság III players
Association football forwards
Hungary youth international footballers
Hungary international footballers
Hungarian expatriate footballers
Expatriate footballers in Austria
Hungarian expatriate sportspeople in Austria
Austrian Football Bundesliga players
Sportspeople from Székesfehérvár